Kajal Aggarwal is an Indian actress who primarily appears in Telugu and Tamil films, alongside a few Hindi films. She made her debut with a minor role in the Hindi film Kyun! Ho Gaya Na... (2004).  Aggarwal debuted in Telugu cinema with Lakshmi Kalyanam (2007), which was her first film as a lead actress but it was a box office failure. Her other Telugu film that year, Chandamama, became her first success. Her first Tamil release Pazhani came the following year. The following year, she had four releases. One of them - S. S. Rajamouli's Telugu film Magadheera - became a major breakthrough for her, and earned her a Filmfare Award for Best Actress – Telugu nomination.
Aggarwal's first release of 2010 was the romantic comedy Darling, which became a commercial success at the box office, and earned her another Filmfare nomination for Best Actress in Telugu. Her other two releases that year — the Tamil thriller Naan Mahaan Alla and another romantic comedy Brindavanam - were also successful, with the latter fetching her the CineMAA Award for Best Actress. In 2011, she appeared in Mr. Perfect, which earned her a third Filmfare nomination for Best Actress in Telugu. In the same year, she returned to Hindi cinema with Singham, a remake of the 2010 Tamil film Singam. For this, she received a Filmfare Award for Best Female Debut nomination. Aggarwal's performance in AR Murugadoss' Thuppakki (2012) won her the CineMAA Award for Best Tamil Actress, and Govindudu Andarivadele (2014) earned her a fourth Filmfare nomination for Best Telugu Actress. She made her television debut with the Tamil-language web series Live Telecast (2021).

Filmography

Films

Television

Notes

References

External links 
 

Actress filmographies
Indian filmographies